Krishna Nee Kunidaga is a 1989 Indian Kannada-language romantic drama film written, directed and produced by Dwarakish. The film stars Vinod Raj and Sudharani, along with C. R. Simha, Jaggesh and Hema Choudhary in supporting roles. The music was composed by Vijayanand to the lyrics of Chi. Udaya Shankar, Hamsalekha and R. N. Jayagopal.

The film told the story of a college student Krishna (Vinod Raj), who aspires to become an accomplished dancer even at the cost of discontinuing his studies and is head over heals in love with a village girl Radha (Sudharani).

Cast

 Vinod Raj as Krishna
 Sudharani as Radha
 Hema Choudhary
 C. R. Simha 
 Nachiketha
 Jaggesh 
 Priya
 Keerthiraj
 Sathyabhama
 Chethan Ramarao

Soundtrack
All the songs are composed and scored by Vijayanand. The songs were appreciated upon release.

Awards

1988-89 - Karnataka State Film Award for Best Editor - Gowthama Raju

References

External links 

Movie online

1989 films
1980s Kannada-language films
1989 romantic drama films
Indian romantic drama films
Films scored by Vijayanand